Spy Game is an American action-adventure television series that aired on ABC for 13 episodes during the spring and summer of 1997. The series was created by screenwriter and physician Ivan Raimi, director Sam Raimi, and writer John McNamara. The series was originally developed under the title Cloak and Dagger, but was renamed prior to airing.

Plot
The series starred Linden Ashby as Lorne Cash, a retired secret agent who reluctantly agrees to get back into the "spy game" and work for a secret government agency. Following the collapse of the former Soviet Union and the downsizing of international intelligence agencies worldwide, the reduced demand for highly qualified espionage agents has flooded the civilian market with displaced former agents. With the surplus of independent agents running rogue operations, Cash is called in to work with a meager agency whose sole directive is to police these newly freelance spies.

Cash contrasts his partner, Max London, played by Allison Smith in their "low" vs. "high" tech approaches to problems. Cash is an expert martial artist and was trained to improvise by re-purposing objects in his environment as tools or weapons; conversely, Max prefers to arm herself with the latest cutting-edge technology and gadgets, which occasionally puts them at odds. For example, when disabling a camera system, Max speculates about defeating it with electronic jamming, while Cash simply puts a post-it note over the lens. Alternately, Cash may spend considerable time trying to defeat an opponent in hand-to-hand, while Max will simply use a tranquilizer gun.

Despite initial friction, the two quickly establish a rapport (with the usual romantic overtures). Some of the show's humor is generated from Lorne's reluctance to use modern gadgets, as well as the occasional revelations about his past and his high connections. In the premiere episode, for example, Lorne calls the president who is a personal friend and is given a security clearance higher than his boss'.

The series was a throwback to the stylish spy series of the 1960s, with particular comparison being made to The Avengers and The Man from U.N.C.L.E., while at the same time poking fun at the genre. (The opening credits were a parody of the opening credits of The Avengers.) The show's first episode featured cameos by numerous stars of spy shows of the past (including Patrick Macnee and Robert Culp).

Spy Game was canceled after nine of the thirteen episodes produced were aired.

Cast
Linden Ashby as Lorne Cash
Allison Smith as Maxine "Max" London
Bruce McCarty as Micah Simms
Keith Szarabajka as Shank

Episodes

Though the last four episodes were never aired in the USA, they were shown overseas, for instance by Channel 4 in the UK (though very late at night).

External links
 
 

1990s American drama television series
1997 American television series debuts
1997 American television series endings
American Broadcasting Company original programming
American action television series
English-language television shows
Espionage television series
Television series by Universal Television
Television series by Warner Bros. Television Studios
Television series created by John McNamara (writer)
Television series created by Sam Raimi
Television shows set in Los Angeles
American action adventure television series